Rome is an unincorporated community in Delaware County, in the U.S. state of Ohio.

History
Rome was laid out in 1836. The community was named after the Italian city of Rome, the founder being interested in Ancient Roman history.  Rome was incorporated in 1838; the village incorporation was later dissolved at an unknown date.

References

Former municipalities in Ohio
Unincorporated communities in Delaware County, Ohio
Unincorporated communities in Ohio